New Baden is an unincorporated community in Robertson County, Texas, United States.

History
New Baden was founded in 1881 by German immigrants. The community opened a post office in 1882; it later grew to contain a drugstore, hotel, church, and railway station. The population of New Baden peaked at 175 in 1915; it declined to 105 by 1970 but rose to 150 in 2000.

Climate
The climate in this area is characterized by hot, humid summers and generally mild to cool winters.  According to the Köppen Climate Classification system, New Baden has a humid subtropical climate, abbreviated "Cfa" on climate maps.

References

Unincorporated communities in Robertson County, Texas
Unincorporated communities in Texas
Bryan–College Station